Southwestern Bell Repeater Station-Wright City, also known as the AT&T Repeater Station and Reliance Automotive, is a historic telephone repeater station located at Wright City, Warren County, Missouri.  It was built in 1930 by Southwestern Bell, and is a one-story, Tudor Revival style variegated brick building. It features decorative quoins and entrance and window surrounds accented by terra cotta.

It was listed on the National Register of Historic Places in 2007.

References

Industrial buildings and structures on the National Register of Historic Places in Missouri
Tudor Revival architecture in Missouri
Industrial buildings completed in 1930
Buildings and structures in Warren County, Missouri
National Register of Historic Places in Warren County, Missouri
AT&T buildings